Two human polls and one formulaic ranking make up the 2004 NCAA Division I-A football rankings. Unlike most sports, college football's governing body, the National Collegiate Athletic Association (NCAA), does not bestow a National Championship title for Division I-A football. That title is primarily bestowed by different polling agencies. There are several polls that currently exist. The main weekly polls are the AP Poll and Coaches Poll. About halfway through the season the Bowl Championship Series (BCS) standings are released. These are the first set of rankings since 1958 that never featured Alabama.

Legend

AP Poll
This season would be the last season that the AP Poll would be included in the BCS formula. The heavy end of the season politicking for ballot position lead the AP to believe that the BCS undermined the independence and integrity of the poll and could hurt the AP's reputation.

Coaches Poll

BCS standings
The Bowl Championship Series (BCS) determined the two teams that competed in the BCS National Championship Game, the 2005 Orange Bowl.

References

Rankings
NCAA Division I FBS football rankings
Bowl Championship Series